Arudan Rural District is a rural district (dehestan) in the Central District of Mohr County, Fars Province, Iran. At the 2006 census, its population was 4,372, in 877 families.  The rural district has 6 villages.

References 

Rural Districts of Fars Province
Mohr County